Jorge Antonio Soto Gómez (born 27 October 1971 in Lima) is a Peruvian retired footballer. He is the brother of footballers José Soto and Giancarlo Soto.

Career
Soto (Nicknamed "The Camel") is one of the all-time emblematic figures of Sporting Cristal. He has played over 500 games for his club and scored more than 170 goals, making him the highest goal scorer in the club's history.

International career
Soto has been capped regularly in the national team since 1992. He was also member of Peru's U-23 squad of 1992. Soto has played in 101 official games for the Peruvian National Team and has scored 9 goals in official competition.

See also
List of men's footballers with 100 or more international caps

References

External links
 

1971 births
Living people
Footballers from Lima
Association football midfielders
Peruvian footballers
Peru international footballers
FIFA Century Club
Deportivo Municipal footballers
Sporting Cristal footballers
Club Atlético Lanús footballers
CR Flamengo footballers
San Luis F.C. players
Club Alianza Lima footballers
FBC Melgar footballers
Peruvian Primera División players
Argentine Primera División players
Liga MX players
1993 Copa América players
1995 Copa América players
1999 Copa América players
2000 CONCACAF Gold Cup players
2001 Copa América players
2004 Copa América players
Peruvian expatriate footballers
Expatriate footballers in Argentina
Expatriate footballers in Brazil
Expatriate footballers in Mexico
Peruvian expatriate sportspeople in Mexico
Peruvian expatriate sportspeople in Brazil